The Torbido is a river in the Calabria region of southern Italy. It might have been the river Sagra of classical antiquity. It rises in the mountains of the Aspromonte National Park and flows in a southeastern direction. It drains into the Ionian Sea at Marina di Gioiosa Ionica after a course of 18 kilometers.

References

Drainage basins of the Ionian Sea
Rivers of the Province of Reggio Calabria
Rivers of Italy